Thomas Cochran (March 20, 1871 – October 29, 1936) was an American banker and college football player and coach.  He served as the head football coach at the University of Minnesota for the 1894 Golden Gophers season, leading the team to a 3–1 record.  He was the second Yale University graduate to coach at Minnesota, following his predecessor, Wallie Winter.  The Minnesota football program was suffering financially, so Cochran delivered lectures titled "Football as Played in the East" at locations around the nation to help raise money.

Life and career
Born in St. Paul, Minnesota on March 20, 1871, Cochran was the son of a lawyer and real-estate broker in New York and St. Paul. He was educated at Phillips Academy Andover and at Yale, where he was an editor of campus humor magazine The Yale Record and a member of the Skull and Bones society.

Cochran was the vice-president of the Astor Trust Company from 1906 to 1914, and president of the Liberty National Bank of New York from 1914 to 1916. He became a partner in J.P. Morgan & Company in 1917.

In the late 1920s and early 1930s, Cochran funded the creation of several buildings on the Phillips Academy campus, notably the Addison Gallery of American Art.

Head coaching record

References

External links

1871 births
1936 deaths
19th-century players of American football
American bankers
American football fullbacks
Minnesota Golden Gophers football coaches
Yale Bulldogs football players
Phillips Academy alumni
Sportspeople from Saint Paul, Minnesota
Players of American football from Saint Paul, Minnesota